Frazier Johnson (born  July 7, 1970) is a former American professional basketball player who last played for Saint-Quentin Basket.

References

External links

1970 births
Living people
Centers (basketball)
American expatriate basketball people in France
American expatriate basketball people in North Macedonia
American men's basketball players
Gaiteros del Zulia players